Forgive and Forget is a 1923 American silent mystery film directed by Howard M. Mitchell and starring Estelle Taylor, Pauline Garon, and Philo McCullough. It was made by Columbia Pictures at the Sunset Gower Studios in Los Angeles.

Plot
A woman (Taylor) having an affair is blackmailed by her lover's roommate (McCullough). When her lover (Steele) is founded dead, her husband (Standing) is then arrested for the murder.

Cast

Preservation
A print of Forgive and Forget with one reel missing is located in the George Eastman Museum Motion Picture Collection.

References

Bibliography
 Dick, Bernard F. The Merchant Prince of Poverty Row: Harry Cohn of Columbia Pictures. University Press of Kentucky.

External links

1923 films
1923 mystery films
American mystery films
Films directed by Howard M. Mitchell
American silent feature films
American black-and-white films
Columbia Pictures films
1920s English-language films
1920s American films
Silent mystery films